Colin Hamilton Benbow (1931 – May 2016) was a history teacher, writer, and member of the House of Assembly of Bermuda for the United Bermuda Party for the constituency of Devonshire South. He was chairman of the Board of Works, Agriculture and Fisheries. While in office he played a part in naming Bermuda's roads. He lost his job on one occasion for his views on the legalization of marijuana.

Selected publications
 A century of progress: A history of the Bermuda Telephone Company Ltd., 1887–1987. 1987.
 Boer Prisoners of War in Bermuda by Colin Benbow. 1994.
 Gladys Morrell And The Women's Suffrage Movement In Bermuda. 1994.
 Hamilton, Bermuda: City and Capital 1897–1997. The Corporation of the City of Hamilton, 1997. (With Marian S. Robb) 
 The Teachers Association of Bermuda: (1949–1964): The Short History of a Small Trade Union. 2000.

References 

United Bermuda Party politicians
2016 deaths
1931 births
Bermudian educators
Bermudian non-fiction writers
Bermudian historians
Members of the House of Assembly of Bermuda